Bob Smiley (born June 28, 1977 in Ventura, California) is a TV/film writer-producer and partner in the Humble Picture Company. He is a Writers Guild of America-award winner for his work in kids' TV and the author of two books, the 2008 memoir Follow the Roar  and the 2012 novel Don't Mess with Travis. He has also been a contributing writer to espn.com.

TV career
Smiley is a writer and producer on the Netflix series Atypical. Before that, he executive produced the Disney Channel pilot Forever Boys. He has also written for Yes, Dear on CBS, The Haunted Hathaways on Nickelodeon, and Puppy Dog Pals on Disney Junior.

Humble Picture Company
In 2016, Smiley founded the Humble Picture Company with writer Grant Nieporte. Their inaugural producing project is a film adaptation of the book Hope Heals.

Follow The Roar
In 2008, Smiley followed Tiger Woods from the gallery for the entirety of Woods' season and wrote a memoir about the adventure. Smiley came up with the idea after following Tiger for the second round of the Target World Challenge in December 2007. Smiley wrote an article for espn.com about the round, in which Tiger shot a tournament-record 62.

External links

Humble Picture Company

References

1977 births
Living people
American male screenwriters
People from Ventura, California
American bloggers
Screenwriters from California
American male bloggers
21st-century American screenwriters